The 2012 Mercury Insurance Open was a tennis tournament played on outdoor hard courts. It was the 3rd edition of the Southern California Open since the tournament left the tour in 2007. It was classified as one of the WTA Premier tournaments of the 2012 WTA Tour. It took place in Carlsbad, California, United States from July 16 to 22.

Singles main-draw entrants

Seeds

 1 Rankings are as of July 9, 2012

Other entrants
The following players received wildcards into the singles main draw:
  Lauren Davis
  Nicole Gibbs 
  Daniela Hantuchová
  CoCo Vandeweghe

The following players received entry from the qualifying draw:
  Chan Yung-jan
  Alexa Glatch 
  Sesil Karatantcheva
  Michelle Larcher de Brito

The following players received entry as lucky loser:
  Melanie Oudin

Withdrawals
  Sorana Cîrstea (right adductor strain)
  Angelique Kerber (low back injury)
  Svetlana Kuznetsova (right knee injury)
  Sabine Lisicki (abdominal Injury)
  Monica Niculescu (left hand injury) 
  Tamira Paszek (left thigh injury)

Retirements
  Yanina Wickmayer (low-back injury)

Doubles main-draw entrants

Seeds

1 Rankings are as of July 9, 2012

Other entrants
The following pair received wildcard into the doubles main draw:
  Mirjana Lučić /  CoCo Vandeweghe

Finals

Singles

 Dominika Cibulková defeated  Marion Bartoli, 6–1, 7–5

Doubles

 Raquel Kops-Jones /  Abigail Spears defeated  Vania King /  Nadia Petrova, 6–2, 6–4

References

External links

Mercury Insurance Open
2012
Carlsbad, California
2012 in sports in California
Sports competitions in San Diego County, California